Domitia pilosicollis is a species of beetle in the family Cerambycidae. It was described by Frederick William Hope in 1843, originally under the genus Hammaticherus.

References

Lamiini
Beetles described in 1843